Jack Purchase (born 26 June 1995) is an Australian professional basketball player for the Forestville Eagles of NBL1 Central. He played college basketball for the Auburn Tigers and Hawaii Rainbow Warriors.

Early life
Purchase was born in Melbourne, Victoria, and attended Carey Baptist Grammar School. He played in the Big V for the Melbourne Tigers between 2012 and 2014.

College career
Purchase played college basketball in the United States for the Auburn Tigers during the 2014–15 season but saw limited playing time and transferred to the Hawaii Rainbow Warriors. Purchase became an immediate starter for the Rainbow Warriors during his sophomore season in 2016–17. He was moved to the bench during his junior season and was named the Big West Best Sixth Player in 2018. Purchase returned to the starting line-up for his senior season and earned second-team All-Big West honours in 2019.

Professional career
Purchase returned to Australia in 2019 and signed with the Melbourne Tigers of the NBL1 for the 2019 season. He joined Melbourne United of the National Basketball League (NBL) as a development player for the 2019–20 season. On 2 March 2021, Purchase signed with the Adelaide 36ers of the NBL as an injury replacement for Isaac Humphries. He played four games in NBL1 Central for the North Adelaide Rockets in the 2021 season before he moved to the Hobart Chargers of NBL1 South.

On 14 September 2021, Purchase signed a two-year deal with the Perth Wildcats. The final year of his contract was declined by the team.

On 7 February 2022, Purchase signed with the Forestville Eagles for the 2022 NBL1 Central season.

Personal life
Purchase's father, Nigel, played in the NBL while his mother, Simone, played in the Women's National Basketball League (WNBL).

His father's sister is married to Australian basketball great, Andrew Gaze.

References

External links
NBL profile
College statistics

1995 births
Living people
Adelaide 36ers players
Auburn Tigers men's basketball players
Australian expatriate basketball people in the United States
Australian men's basketball players
Perth Wildcats players
Basketball players from Melbourne
Forwards (basketball)
Hawaii Rainbow Warriors basketball players
Melbourne United players